Stroka is a surname. Notable people with the surname include:

 Anna Stroka (1923–2020), Polish literary historian, author, and translator
 Michael Stroka (1938–1997), American actor
  (born 1980), Polish fencer